The 2004 CFL Draft took place on Wednesday, April 28, 2004. 53 players were chosen from among eligible players from Canadian Universities across the country, as well as Canadian players playing in the NCAA. Of the 53 draft selections, 35 players were drafted from Canadian Interuniversity Sport institutions.

Round one

Round two

Round three

Round four

Round five

Round six

References

Canadian College Draft
Cfl Draft, 2004